This is a chronological list of Argentine classical composers.

Romantic
 Amancio Jacinto Alcorta (1805–1862)
 Juan Pedro Esnaola (1808–1878)
 Zenón Rolón (1856–1902)

Modern/Contemporary

 Alberto Williams (1862–1952)
 Rosendo Mendizabal (1868–1913)
 Ettore Panizza (1875–1967)
 Enrique Saborido (1877–1941)
 José Antonio Bottiroli (1920–1990)
 Carlos López Buchardo (1881–1948)
 Felipe Boero (1884–1958)
 Roberto Firpo (1884–1969)
 Juan de Dios Filiberto (1885–1964)
 Carlos Gardel (1890–1935)
 Juan José Castro (1895–1968)
 Enrique Maciel (1897–1962)
 Terig Tucci (1897–1973)
 Rosita Melo (1897–1981)
 Julio de Caro (1899–1980)
 Juan Carlos Paz (1901–1972)
 Osvaldo Pugliese (1905–1995)
 Carlos Guastavino (1912–2000)
 Hector Ayala (1914–1990)
 José Bragato (1915–2017)
 Alberto Ginastera (1916–1983)
 Marcelo Koc (1918–2006)
 Ástor Piazzolla (1921–1992)
 Ariel Ramírez (1921–2010)
 Mariano Mores (1922–2016)
 Hilda Dianda (Born 1925)
 Nelly Moretto (1925–1978)
 Fernando González Casellas (1925–1998)
 Rodolfo Arízaga (1926–1985)
 Atilio Stampone (Born 1926)
 Irma Urteaga (1929–2022)
 Mauricio Kagel (1931–2008)
 Jorge Morel (1931–2021)
 Antonio Agri (1932–1998)
 Waldo de los Ríos (1934–1977)
 Mario Davidovsky (1934–2019)
 Alicia Terzian (Born 1934)
 Maria Teresa Luengo (Born 1940)
 Graciela Castillo (Born 1940)
 Graciela Paraskevaidis (Born 1940)
 Sergio Calligaris (Born 1941)
 Oscar Edelstein (Born 1953)
 Silvina Milstein (Born 1956)
 Eduardo Alonso-Crespo (Born 1956)
 Daniel Doura (born 1957)
 Marcela Pavia (Born 1957)
 Miguel del Aguila (Born 1957)
 Máximo Diego Pujol (Born 1957)
 Daniel Freiberg (Born 1957)
 Alejandro Civilotti (Born 1959)
 Osvaldo Golijov (Born 1960)
 Juan Carlos Tolosa (Born 1966)
 Esteban Benzecry (Born 1970)

Classical Composers
Argentine

Argentine music-related lists
Argentine